The Love Commandment or Thou Shalt Not Steal (German: Du sollst nicht stehlen) is a 1928 German silent film directed by Victor Janson and starring Werner Fuetterer, Dina Gralla and Lilian Harvey.

The film's art direction was by Jacek Rotmil.

Cast
Werner Fuetterer as Raul Warburg  
Dina Gralla as Yvonne Warburg, his sister 
Lilian Harvey as Lotte  
Bruno Kastner as Robert Erler  
Charlotte Susa as Lilly  
Erich Kaiser-Titz as Detective  
Ernst Behmer as Franz, Diener bei Warburg  
Nico Turoff as burglar

References

External links

Films of the Weimar Republic
German silent feature films
Films directed by Victor Janson
UFA GmbH films
German black-and-white films